Cumplido is a Spanish surname meaning "well done" or "perfect". Notable people with the surname include:
Francisco Cumplido (1930–2022), Chilean politician
Guadalupe Gracia García-Cumplido (1881–1948), Mexican military surgeon
Juan Nepomuceno Cumplido (1793–1851), Mexican politician, former governor of Jalisco

Spanish-language surnames